David Pine may refer to:
 
David Andrew Pine (1891–1970), American judge 
David J. Pine, American physicist
David Pine (diplomat), New Zealand High Commissioner to India, Bangladesh and Nepal, former High Commissioner to Malaysia and Brunei, and former ambassador to the Philippines.

See also
David Pines (1924–2018), American physicist